G v Auckland Hospital Board [1976] 1 NZLR 638 is a cited case in New Zealand regarding civil damages claims from crime victims being barred under the Accident Compensation Act.

Background
G was raped by an employee of Auckland Hospital whilst she was a patient, and subsequently sued the hospital for damages for the rape.

The hospital defended the claim saying that such a claim was barred under section 5 of the Accident Compensation Act 1972.

G countered that the actions of the staff member were clearly deliberate, and so could not be referred to as an accident.

Held
The court ruled that the true test was to look at the event from the victim's view, not the other party's view. That being the case, the rape was an accident under the Act, making a damages claim barred under section 5.

Footnote: The date that the offending occurred, 2 April 1974, was unfortunate as it was only 1 day after the Accident Compensation Act [1972] came into force. Had it happened before this date, her claim would not have been legally barred.

References

High Court of New Zealand cases
New Zealand tort case law
1975 in New Zealand law
Crime in Auckland
1975 in case law
1974 crimes in New Zealand